Mikhail Yefimovich Shvydkoy (born September 5, 1948, Kant, Chuy Region, Kirghiz Soviet Socialist Republic, USSR) is a Soviet and Russian theater critic, drama, social and political activist. Laureate of the State Prize of Russia. The artistic director of the Moscow theater musical, supervisor of the Faculty of the Graduate School of cultural policy and management in the humanitarian sphere, Moscow State University.

Russian Minister of Culture February 8, 2000 – March 9, 2004. Chairman of the Federal Agency for Culture and Cinematography (June 30, 2004 – June 7, 2008).

Honours 
Order For Merit to the Fatherland   4th (2008)
 Order of Friendship (2013) 
 Order of the Badge of Honour
 National Order of Merit (France)
 Order of Merit of the Italian Republic (2012) 
 Legion of Honour (2011) 
 Commander of the Order of Saint-Charles.

Awards 
 State Prize of the Russian Federation (2000)

References

External links
 Швыдкой — новый президент АРТ
 Школа злословия с участием Михаила Швыдкого
 Интервью Михаила Швыдкого на радио «Эхо Москвы»

1948 births
Living people
Knights Commander of the Order of Merit of the Federal Republic of Germany
Grand Officers of the Order of Merit of the Italian Republic
Chevaliers of the Légion d'honneur
Knights of the Ordre national du Mérite
Recipients of the Gold Medal for Merit to Culture – Gloria Artis
State Prize of the Russian Federation laureates
Russian television presenters
Russian art historians
Russian Academy of Theatre Arts alumni
Academic staff of Moscow State University
Communist Party of the Soviet Union members
Soviet Jews
Russian Jews
Culture ministers of Russia